Telince is a village and municipality in the Nitra District in western central Slovakia, in the Nitra Region.

History
In historical records the village was first mentioned in 1297.

Geography
The village lies at an altitude of 163 metres and covers an area of 6.844 km². It has a population of about 320 people.

Ethnicity
The population is about 80% Slovak and 20% Magyar.

References

External links
http://www.statistics.sk/mosmis/eng/run.html

Villages and municipalities in Nitra District